Late Night Guitar is an album by jazz guitarist Earl Klugh that was released in 1980. The album received a Grammy nomination for Best Pop Instrumental Performance at the 24th Grammy Awards in 1982. In this release, Klugh is joined by strings and horns in an orchestra arranged and conducted by David Matthews.

Track listing

Charts

References 

1980 albums
Earl Klugh albums
Albums arranged by David Matthews (keyboardist)
Blue Note Records albums